The Five Nations Passport Group is an international forum between the passport-issuing authorities of Australia, Canada, New Zealand, the United Kingdom and the United States to share best practices in the issuance, development, and management of passports. The annual Five Nations Passport Conference is a largely informal in-person meeting between officials of the participating agencies, with some additional invited guests such as the Irish Department of Foreign Affairs and Trade in 2011. It has taken place since at least as far back as 2004.

The member states' issuing authorities are comparable to each other: their passport issuance systems are mostly centralised and their service channels are similar to each other. None of the Five Nation countries have a compulsory identity management system, which means that citizens' personal information is not available in a central citizenship database or registry.

Participating issuing authorities
The agencies that participate in the Five Nations Passport Group for each state is their relevant passport-issuing authority. 

: Australian Passport Office
: Immigration, Refugees and Citizenship Canada
: Department of Internal Affairs
: His Majesty's Passport Office
: Department of State

Passport specifications 
Unlike EU passports, which follow a common format, Five Nations passports develop through the sharing of best practices and information relating to the development of passports. However, all Five Nations passports are biometric and machine-readable, and B7 sized (ISO/IEC 7810 ID-3, 88 mm × 125 mm).

Generally, Five Nations passport holders have access to each other's automated border control systems. Currently, all Five Nations passport holders have access to Australia and New Zealand's SmartGate system and the UK's ePassport gates. Similarly, British passport holders have access to the US's Global Entry programme, while Canadians have access to the NEXUS programme. Australia is also planning to participate in Global Entry.

Passport circulation 
The number of Five Nations passports in circulation is:

See also 
 Anglosphere
 Border Five
 CANZUK
 Five Country Conference
 Five Eyes
Australian passport
British passport
Canadian passport
New Zealand passport
United States passport
 United States Passport Card

Notes

References

Anglosphere
Passports